The 1926 Denver Pioneers football team was an American football team that represented the University of Denver as a member of the Rocky Mountain Conference (RMC) during the 1926 college football season. In their second season under head coach Fred Dawson, the Pioneers compiled a 4–4 record (4–4 against conference opponents), tied for sixth place in the RMC, and outscored opponents by a total of 106 to 72.

Schedule

References

Denver
Denver Pioneers football seasons
Denver Pioneers football